Rex Clive Hooton (born 14 February 1947) is a former New Zealand cricketer who played first-class cricket for Auckland and Northern Districts. A right-hand bat and slow left-arm orthodox spin bowler, Hooton played 19 first-class matches from 1968 until 1980, and enjoyed some success with both the bat and occasionally with the ball. He scored three half-centuries during his career, as well as taking five wickets at a respectable 12.60.

Playing career

Hooton was born in Auckland, New Zealand, and played his earliest top-class cricket matches for Waikato during the winter of 1968. He joined Northern Districts in January 1969, and played his first match for them on 27 January against Canterbury. Opening the batting, Hooton scored two and three as the match ended in a draw. Hooton did not feature in another Northern Districts line up until Christmas Day 1969, where he faced Central Districts, scoring 46 in his only innings as the match ended in another draw. This was the first of seven matches Hooton played during the 1969–70 season, where he scored 228 runs including one fifty at 20.72. He also took four wickets at 14.25 with his spin bowling. These included figures a match against the Australian touring team in Napier on 2 March 1970, having been chosen for the New Zealand Under-23s. Batting at three, Hooton failed to make a substantial impact, scoring six and five as Australia won by an innings and 20 runs.

Hooton played five more matches over the winter of 1971–72, scoring 132 runs at 14.66, however he failed to pass fifty with a high score of 41. His final season, after a seven-year absence, was the winter of 1979–80, where he played six matches for Auckland. This final season was Hooton's most successful with the bat, scoring 233 runs at 29.12, including two fifties, one of which matches his career best 54. He also took one final wicket with his spin, ending with a bowling average of 6.00. It was during this season that Hooton played his only List-A match, also for Auckland, where he scored 16 runs, however he did not bowl.

Professional coaching career

Rex coached Auckland from 1989 to 1992. They won the Shell Cup (List A) in the 1989–90 season and the Shell Trophy (First Class) in 1990–91. He later turned his hand to selecting and was convenor of selectors from 1993 to 1995 and again from 1998 to 2001.

Later life

Rex is currently President and Honorary Member of Auckland Cricket, and Past President of both the Auckland Cricket Society and the Auckland University Cricket Club, where he is also a Life Member. He was the school cricket coach at St Kentigern College in Auckland from 2009 to 2015 and held a similar role at St Edward's School in Oxford during the northern summer from 2011 to 2015.

See also
 List of Auckland representative cricketers

References

External links
 
 Player Profile: Rex Hooton from CricketArchive

1947 births
Auckland cricketers
Living people
New Zealand cricketers
Northern Districts cricketers
Cricketers from Auckland